Toutel  is a village and rural commune in Mauritania, near the border of Senegal.

Communes of Mauritania